The year 581 BC was a year of the pre-Julian Roman calendar. In the Roman Empire, it was known as year 173 Ab urbe condita . The denomination 581 BC for this year has been used since the early medieval period, when the Anno Domini calendar era became the prevalent method in Europe for naming years.

Events
 The Isthmian Games are founded at Corinth.
 Suizei becomes the second Emperor of Japan (until 549 BC).

Births

Deaths
 Jing, Chinese ruler (duke) of Jin

References